Ukhati is a village in the historical region of Khevi, north-eastern Georgia. It is located on the right bank of the Tergi river. Administratively, it is part of the Kazbegi Municipality in Mtskheta-Mtianeti. Distance to the municipality center Stepantsminda is 21 km.

Sources 
 Georgian Soviet Encyclopedia, V. 10, p. 201, Tbilisi, 1986 year.

References

Kobi Community villages